Ian Dyer (born 22 August 1948) is a former  Australian rules footballer who played with St Kilda in the Victorian Football League (VFL).

Notes

External links 

Living people
1948 births
Australian rules footballers from Victoria (Australia)
St Kilda Football Club players
Bairnsdale Football Club players